Simon Cooke (born 25 September 1976) is a New Zealand sailor. He competed in the men's 470 event at the 2000 Summer Olympics. In 2002, he won the world championship 470 event with Peter Nicholas. In 2019, he coached the Thailand team for the world championships held in Japan. He is a World Champion winning the 2002 470 World Championship and two time RS Feva World Champion.

References

External links
 

1976 births
Living people
New Zealand male sailors (sport)
Olympic sailors of New Zealand
470 class world champions
RS Feva world champions
World champions in sailing for New Zealand
Sailors at the 2000 Summer Olympics – 470
Sportspeople from Hamilton, New Zealand